Bearman is a surname. Notable people with the surname include:

Joe Bearman (born 1982), English rugby union player
Joshuah Bearman, American writer
Greg Bearman (born 1975), Canadian Football League player
Peter Bearman (born 1956), American sociologist
Oliver Bearman (born 2005), British motor racing driver